The Presbyterian Church of Uruguay (in Spanish Iglesia Presbiteriana del Uruguay or IPUY) is a Protestant Reformed, confessional, conservative and Calvinist denomination in Uruguay, formed by missions of the Presbyterian Agency for Transcultural Missions of the Presbyterian Church of Brazil.

The work of the church began in the city of Montevideo and currently has congregations in other cities of the country.

History 
Presbyterianism has been around since 1560, having grown out of the formation of the Church of Scotland, through the work of the reformer John Knox. This, he was the reformer of his country after having spent years in Geneva with John Calvin. As such, Presbyterianism is a family of Reformed Churches and Calvinism.

In 2009, the Presbyterian Agency for Transcultural Missions of the Presbyterian Church of Brazil began missionary work in Montevideo in Uruguay. In 2014 the church was officially organized, and that same year it founded a congregation in Mercedes.

The church has a seminary to train its own workers and ordains Uruguayan priests and deacons.

Doctrine 

As a result of the mission of a conservative church, the Presbyterian Church of Uruguay has the same attitude regarding ordination and doctrine. The church admits only male candidates for deacon, elder, or minister.

The church system of government is Presbyterian, the church is evangelical, believes in biblical inerrancy and subscribes to the Westminster confession of faith

Inter-church relations 
The denomination is a member of the World Reformed Fellowship In addition, it has the help of the Presbyterian Agency for Transcultural Missions, of the Presbyterian Church of Brazil, for the planting of new churches in the country  It also has relations with the Presbyterian Church in America , Orthodox Presbyterian Church and Presbyterian Church of Chile.

References 

Presbyterian denominations in South America